Verlag Ferdinand Schöningh is a German publishing house, founded in the 19th century by Ferdinand Schöningh. It is based in Paderborn and focuses on the fields of contemporary history, academic theology, philosophy, philology, and pedagogy. Since 2017 it is an imprint of Brill Publishers.

References

External links

Ferdinand Schöningh

Book publishing companies of Germany
Publishing companies of Germany
Mass media in Paderborn